The Ningbo dialect is a dialect of Wu Chinese, one subdivision of Chinese language. Ningbo dialect is spoken throughout Ningbo and Zhoushan prefectures, in Zhejiang province.

Intelligibility
Ningbo dialect native speakers generally understand Shanghainese, another dialect of Wu. However, Shanghainese speakers do not always have full understanding of the Ningbo dialect. It is not mutually intelligible with Mandarin Chinese, or any other subdivision of the Chinese languages. The Ningbo dialect is considered a Yongjiang dialect or Mingzhou dialect (as both terms are synonymous), and is closely related to the Taihu Wu dialects of Zhoushan. In terms of inter-intelligibility between dialects within the Yong-Jiang subgroup, they can be more accurately described as 'accents' as these dialects are relatively uniform and almost identical to each other aside from pronunciation differences and some minor lexical differences.

Phonology

Initials

Finals

Syllabic continuants:      

Notes:
The table contains two additional finals . These have merged with  respectively in younger generations.
 are similar in pronunciation, differing slightly in lip rounding ( respectively). The two are merged in younger generations.
 is pronounced  before rounded vowels.

Middle Chinese  rimes have become glottal stops, .

Tones

Examples
唱月亮

月亮菩薩彎彎上，彎到小姑進后堂。
后堂空，拜相公，
相公念經，打一天井，
天井隔笆，打一稻花，
稻花耘田，打一團箕。

火瑩頭

火瑩頭，夜夜紅，
阿公挑擔賣碗蔥，
新婦織麻糊燈籠，
阿婆箝牌捉牙虫，
兒子看鴨撩屙虫。

See also
Wu Chinese
Shanghainese
Suzhounese
Hangzhounese
List of varieties of Chinese

References

Ningbo dialect Video on YouTube

Wu Chinese